Nuestra Belleza Chiapas 2010, was held at the Polyforum Chiapas, Tuxtla Gutiérrez, Chiapas on July 27, 2010. At the conclusion of the final night of competition, Grissel Hernández of Tecpatán was crowned the winner. Hernández  was crowned by outgoing Nuestra Belleza Chiapas titleholder, Claudia Espinoza. Twelve contestants competed for the state title.

Results

Placements

Background Music
Erik Rubin
Christian Chávez

Contestants

References

External links
Official Website

Nuestra Belleza México